Priced to Sell is the fifth studio album by Funk, Inc., released in 1974.

Track listing

Personnel
Gene Barr – Tenor saxophone
Michael Hughes – Drums
Cecil Hunt – Conga
Jackie Kelso, Jay Migliori, Bill Green – Reeds
Ruby Turner, Billy Fender – Guitar
Bobby Watley, Terry Fairfax – Keyboards
Snooky Young, Allen DeRienzo – Trumpet
Edna Wright, Gregory Matta, Augie Johnson, Billie Barnum, Jim Gilstrap - Background vocals

Charts

External links
 Funk, Inc – Priced to Sell at Discogs

1974 albums
Funk, Inc. albums
Prestige Records albums